Concepcion, officially the Municipality of Concepcion, is a 6th class municipality in the province of Misamis Occidental, Philippines. According to the 2020 census, it has a population of 9,324 people.

It is considered as a suburb to the provincial capital Oroquieta.

Geography

Climate

Barangays
Concepcion is politically subdivided into 18 barangays.
 Bagong Nayon
 Capule
 New Casul
 Guiban
 Laya-an
 Lingatongan
 Maligubaan
 Mantukoy
 Marugang
 Poblacion
 Pogan
 Small Potongan
 Soso-on
 Upper Dapitan
 Upper Dioyo
 Upper Potongan
 Upper Salimpono
 Virayan

Demographics

Economy

References

External links
 [ Philippine Standard Geographic Code]
Philippine Census Information
Local Governance Performance Management System

Municipalities of Misamis Occidental